Typhoon Della, known in Japan as the 3rd Miyakojima Typhoon (第3宮古島台風) and in the Philippines as Typhoon Maring, was a typhoon that struck Miyakojima of Ryukyu Islands and Kyūshū Island in September 1968.

Meteorological history 

Della passed near Miyakojima on September 22nd. After that, it proceeded along the Nansei Islands and landed near Kushikino City, Kagoshima Prefecture on the 24th.

Impact 

Due to the typhoon, storms in Miyakojima caused major damage to homes and crops. In Kagoshima prefecture, the damage caused by salt wind and storm surge was great. On the Pacific side of western Japan, heavy rainfall caused flood damage. 

The typhoon killed 11 people and injured 80 in Japan. In addition, more than 20,000 houses were damaged. 

Della caused a great deal of damage to Miyakojima, so the Japan Meteorological Agency named Della the "3rd Miyakojima Typhoon".

In the past, Typhoon Sarah in 1959 and Typhoon Cora in 1966 struck Miyako Island as well, so they are named "Miyakojima Typhoon" and "2nd Miyakojima Typhoon", respectively.

See also 
 Typhoon Sarah (1959) - Miyakojima Typhoon
 Typhoon Cora (1966) - 2nd Miyakojima Typhoon

References

External links 

Miyako Islands
1968 in Japan
Typhoons in Japan
1968 Pacific typhoon season